Dysoxylum parasiticum, known as yellow mahogany, is a species of rainforest trees in the family Meliaceae. The specific epithet  is from the Latin meaning "parasitic", referring to the idea (now known to be incorrect) that the flowers are parasitic on another tree species.

Taxonomy and naming
Swedish naturalist Pehr Osbeck described this species as Melia parasitica in 1751, before it was transferred to the genus Dysoxylum by Indonesian botanist André Joseph Guillaume Henri Kostermans in 1966. Australian populations were known as Dysoxylum schiffneri.

The Bajau people of Sabah know it as jarum-jarum, while it is commonly known as yellow mahogany in Queensland.

Description
The smooth bark is yellowish to grey-brown. The sweetly scented flowers are white or creamish-coloured. Both flowers and fruits grow directly off the trunk (cauliflory) to near ground level, or off the large branches (ramiflory).

Distribution and habitat
Dysoxylum parasiticum trees grow naturally in Taiwan and throughout Malesia, to New Guinea, the Solomon Islands and Queensland. Their habitat is rainforest from sea-level to  altitude.

Uses
Dysoxylum parasiticum has potential as a feature tree in parks or gardens in areas with subtropical or tropical climates. It prefers acid soils with good drainage and dappled sun or part-shade. The species can be propagated by fresh seed.

References

parasiticum
Trees of Taiwan
Trees of Malesia
Trees of Papuasia
Trees of Australia
Flora of Queensland
Plants described in 1966